The Edgar Holloway House is a historic house in Gilroy, California. It was built in 1903 for Edgar and Dora Holloway, whose grandparents had taken part in the California Gold Rush. After they died in 1912–1913, the house was sold out of the Holloway family. It belonged to the Barshinger family until 1949, and it was later repurposed as a battered women's shelter.

The house was designed by William H. Weeks in the Colonial Revival and Victorian architectural styles. It has been listed on the National Register of Historic Places since January 28, 1982.

References

Houses on the National Register of Historic Places in California
National Register of Historic Places in Santa Clara County, California
Victorian architecture in California
Colonial Revival architecture in California
Houses completed in 1903